York County is a county in the U.S. state of Nebraska. As of the 2010 United States Census, the population was 13,665. Its county seat is York.

In the Nebraska license plate system, York County is represented by the prefix 17 (it had the seventeenth-largest number of vehicles registered in the county when the license plate system was established in 1922).

History
York County was organized in 1870. Sources differ on the origin of the county's name: some state it was named after York in England, while others maintain it was named by early settlers from York County, Pennsylvania.

Geography
The terrain of York County consists of rolling prairie, mostly devoted to agriculture. The ground slopes toward the Platte River, to the northwest.

Major highways

  Interstate 80
  U.S. Highway 34
  U.S. Highway 81
  Nebraska Highway 69

Adjacent counties

 Butler County – northeast
 Seward County – east
 Saline County – southeast
 Fillmore County – south
 Clay County - southwest
 Hamilton County – west
 Polk County – north

Protected areas

 Kirkpatrick Basin North State Wildlife Area
 Kirkpatrick Basin South State Wildlife Area
 Renquist Basin State Wildlife Management Area
 Waco Waterfowl Production Area

Demographics

As of the 2000 United States Census, there were 14,598 people, 5,722 households, and 3,931 families in the county. The population density was 25 people per square mile (10/km2). There were 6,172 housing units at an average density of 11 per square mile (4/km2). The racial makeup of the county was 96.78% White, 0.96% Black or African American, 0.29% Native American, 0.49% Asian, 0.08% Pacific Islander, 0.64% from other races, and 0.77% from two or more races. 1.40% of the population were Hispanic or Latino of any race. 52.0% were of German, 8.2% Irish, 7.2% English and 5.1% Swedish ancestry.

There were 5,722 households, out of which 31.10% had children under the age of 18 living with them, 60.20% were married couples living together, 6.00% had a female householder with no husband present, and 31.30% were non-families. 27.50% of all households were made up of individuals, and 14.00% had someone living alone who was 65 years of age or older. The average household size was 2.42 and the average family size was 2.96.

The county population contained 25.30% under the age of 18, 9.00% from 18 to 24, 25.40% from 25 to 44, 23.00% from 45 to 64, and 17.40% who were 65 years of age or older. The median age was 39 years. For every 100 females there were 91.50 males. For every 100 females age 18 and over, there were 88.80 males.

The median income for a household in the county was $37,093, and the median income for a family was $44,741. Males had a median income of $30,658 versus $19,874 for females. The per capita income for the county was $17,670. About 6.00% of families and 8.50% of the population were below the poverty line, including 9.90% of those under age 18 and 7.10% of those age 65 or over.

Communities

Cities 

 Henderson

 York (county seat)

Villages 

 Benedict
 Bradshaw
 Gresham
 Lushton
 McCool Junction
 Thayer
 Waco

Former Communities 
 Charlestown
 Houston

Government
The County Board of Commissioners is the executive and legislative authority of the county.

Politics
York County voters have traditionally been strong Republicans. In only one national election since 1916 has the county selected the Democratic Party candidate (as of 2020).

See also
 National Register of Historic Places listings in York County, Nebraska
 York News-Times

References

 
1870 establishments in Nebraska
Populated places established in 1870